Sally Norton (born 1973) is an Australian plant scientist and national Leader of the Australian Grains Genebank, Agriculture Victoria, in Horsham. Norton has over 20 years' experience in the collection, characterisation and management of plant genetic resources in seedbanks, specialising in crop wild relatives. She is working to establish the Australian Grains Genebank as the national focal point for access to grains germplasm for use in Australia's research and grain crop breeding programs.

Early life and education 
Norton was born in Brunswick, Victoria in 1973. She attended Padua College, Mornington, and received a Bachelor of Agricultural Science from La Trobe University in 1997. She was awarded a PhD from Southern Cross University in 2007 for her work evaluating the genetic relationships of tertiary genepool and cultivated Sorghum.

Career 
Norton began her career with the Australian Tropical Crops and Forages Collection, Biloela, with the then Queensland Department of Primary Industries. Norton worked as a scientist and curator, with a focus on the improvement of seedbank conservation practices for Australia's tropical crop wild relatives.

In 2013, Norton took on the role as national Leader for the Australian Grains Genebank located in Horsham, Victoria. The Australian Grains Genebank was established in 2013 through co-investment of $6 million by the Grains Research and Development Corporation and the Victorian Department of Environment and Primary Industries and shares resources with a global network of seedbanks, including Svalbard Global Seed Vault.

References

Australian women botanists
21st-century Australian women scientists
Living people
1973 births
Scientists from Melbourne
Southern Cross University alumni
La Trobe University alumni
People from Brunswick, Victoria